The European Film Academy is an initiative of a group of European filmmakers who came together in Berlin on the occasion of the first presentation of the European Film Awards in November 1988.

Every year, the European Film Academy honours films and filmmakers with the European Film Awards. The ceremony is taking place every even year in a different European city, and every odd year in Berlin.

European Film Academy
The academy—under the name of European Cinema Society—was founded by Swedish director Ingmar Bergman, as well as 40 filmmakers from all over Europe, among them Bernardo Bertolucci, Claude Chabrol, Dušan Makavejev, István Szabó, and Wim Wenders.  Bergman became the first president,  and Wenders was elected chairman. A year later, the European Cinema Society was renamed European Film Academy and was registered as a non-profit association.

In 1996, Wenders took over the presidency from Bergman, and the British producer Nik Powell was elected chairman. The board of the academy consists of members representing various parts of Europe. Board members are elected for a period of 2 years, with a maximum period of 3 periods. Board meetings take place 3 times a year, one of which is in Berlin, where the academy is headquartered.

Polish veteran filmmaker Agnieszka Holland was elected the third president of the European Film Academy in 2021. The current chair of the board is Irish-British film producer Mike Downey.

Based on a decision of the general assembly, the number of members—originally limited to 99—has been continuously increasing and has now reached 4,225 (as of December 2021). The academy is working in close contact with the most institutions and organisations that form the backbone of the European film industry.

Organisational structure

President: Agnieszka Holland (since 2021)
Chair of the board: Mike Downey (since 2020)
CEO and director: Matthijs Wouter Knol (since 2021)
Deputy chairs: Rebecca O'Brien, Ada Solomon
Current members of the board: Graziella Bildesheim, Bettina Brokemper, Virginie Devesa, Joana Domingues, Marta Donzelli, Ildikó Enyedi, Nina Hoss, Mike Goodridge, Baltasar Kormákur, Christophe Leparc, Leontine Petit, Antonio Saura, Katriel Schory, Jim Sheridan, Mira Staleva, Joanna Szymańska.
Honorary members of the board: Sir Ben Kingsley, István Szabó
  Former honorary members of the board: Dušan Makavejev, Jeanne Moreau

Members per country

Listed are all countries with more than 20 European Film Academy members. The European Film Academy is active and has members in 52 countries, including those of geographical Europe as well as Israel and Palestine.

Funding

The European Film Academy is mainly funded by the Stiftung Deutsche Klassenlotterie Berlin (German National Lottery), the German State Minister for Culture and the Media, and Medienboard Berlin-Brandenburg. The presentation of the European Film Awards are financed independently from the Academy. Founded in 2006 to produce the European Film Awards ceremony for television, European Film Academy Productions (formerly EFA Productions) gGmbH is the in-house production arm and as such a subsidiary company of the European Film Academy e.V. Since many years, the European Film Awards have been supported by patrons from the international film industry. Their commitment demonstrates the importance that the international film industry attaches to the European Film Awards.

Changes 

Since 2021, the European Film Academy refrains from the use of the abbreviation "EFA" and instead refers to itself using its full name or the short form "scademy". It has reshaped its corporate identity setting up a new digital infrastructure and by introducing a new logo, both in August 2021. The logo has been designed by Polish design agency Huncwot.

Annual academy programme

Throughout the year, the European Film Academy initiates and participates in a series of activities dealing with film politics as well as economic, artistic, and training aspects. The programme includes conferences, seminars and workshops, and a common goal is to build a bridge between creativity and the industry. Some of the Academy's events have become an institution for encounters within the European film community:

The Short Film Initiative Is an initiative by the European Film Academy in co-operation with fifteen festivals throughout Europe. At each of these festivals, an independent jury presents one of the European short films in competition with a nomination in the short film category of the European Film Awards.

A Sunday in the Country Is a special weekend encounter between approx. 10 young European filmmakers and some established European Film Academy members. The private atmosphere of these gatherings guarantees an exchange of ideas and experience which goes far beyond the results of usual workshops.

Conferences and Seminars A series of conferences initiated and/or supported by the European Film Academy enhance a European debate on film, create platforms for a vivid exchange among film professionals and ensure that the discussion of what European film is, how it is changing and where it is going never expires.

Master Classes Offer valuable training opportunities for young talent, combining theoretical and practical training. The high-profile list of former masters includes renowned film professionals such as Jean-Jacques Annaud, Jan De Bont, Henning Carlsen, André Delvaux, Bernd Eichinger, Krzysztof Kieślowski, Jiří Menzel, Tilda Swinton, István Szabó, Marc Weigert, Mike Newell, Tsui Hark, Allan Starski and Anthony Dod Mantle.

European Film Awards

The annual European Film Awards ceremony (until 1997 known as FELIX) is the most high-profile activity of the European Film Academy. With the awards the Academy pursues the following aims: attracting the interest of the audience in European cinema, promoting its cultural and artistic qualities, and regaining the public's confidence in its entertainment value. To put these ideas into practice, the People's Choice Award was added as a new category in 1997. As of 2020, the People's Choice Award merged with the Lux Award of the European Parliament into the joint initiative LUX Audience Award. The nominees for the LUX Audience Award are announced during the ceremony of the European Film Awards. After this, screenings of the nominated films are organised for the public in several European cities.

The members of the European Film Academy actively participate in the selection, nomination and awarding procedures for the European Film Awards.

Taking place in the second weekend of December, the European Film Awards are the first in the international awards season. Most of the nominees and winners of the European Film Awards are found in the following months among the nominees and winners of the Golden Globes or the Oscars. In the past years, European producers and distributors repeatedly stressed that a nomination for or win at the European Film Awards had a positive impact on the chances for their films to win further international awards, such as a Golden Globe or an Oscar.

Sidebar events

Throughout the year, the academy organises a sidebar programme on the occasion of the European Film Awards. Originally, this was a week-end with panel discussions and conferences in the city where the Awards ceremony would take place. At these events, innovative production methods for the new millennium were discussed at the conference (Berlin 1999), or European filmmakers of international reputation (among them, Wim Wenders, Liv Ullmann, Tom Tykwer, Dominik Moll, Pavel Lungin, Maria de Medeiros) as well as the then EU commissioner Viviane Reding made very personal and visionary speeches on the artistic, cultural, and social role of cinema in front of 800 guests at Theâtre de l'Odéon in Paris, where the conference "E LA NAVE VA - For a New Energy in European Cinema" was held (2000). Significant changes to the annual programme were introduced in 2021.

Month of European Film 

As of 2022, the European Film Academy organises an annual "Month of European Film". This programme highlights European films in the month prior to the European Film Awards, both in European cinemas, on television as well as in cooperation with streaming platforms. A pilot edition of the Month of European Film took place in Berlin in 2021. The first official edition of the Month of European Film will be launched in November 2022 at the Seville European Film Festival and will take place simultaneously in a range of European cities.

See also

References

External links

European cinema
Film organisations in Germany
Organisations based in Berlin
Organizations established in 1988